Runanga may refer to:

Rūnanga, a traditional Māori assembly or tribal gathering
Rūnanga, the governing council or administrative group of a Māori Hapū or Iwi
Rūnanga, a Maori (language) translation of board of directors or council
Runanga, New Zealand, a small town on the West Coast of New Zealand's South Island
Runanga (crater)
Runanga Lake, in the Hawke's Bay Region of New Zealand's North Island